"For Lovers" is the debut single by Wolfman featuring Pete Doherty. The single reached No. 7 in the UK singles chart. Rumours that the pair received relatively little money, having already sold the publishing rights for a small amount in a pub are unfounded as in reality the rights were shared amongst the musicians who worked mostly without pay on the recording.

In 2005 the song was nominated for an Ivor Novello Award for songwriting.

Track listing

CD 
 "For Lovers"
 "Back From The Dead"
 "For Lovers" (Video)

7" 
 "For Lovers"
 "Back From The Dead"

Chart performance

References

External links
"For Lovers" lyrics

2004 singles
Pete Doherty songs
Songs written by Pete Doherty
2004 songs
Rough Trade Records singles
UK Independent Singles Chart number-one singles